François Chicoyneau was a French doctor and physician. He was born in Montpellier on 23 April 1672 and died in Versailles on 13 April 1752 (at age 79). Chicoyneau was the First Physician to King Louis XV.

Family 
François Chicoyneau was born in Montpellier in 1672. He comes from the nobility of the robe.

Parents 
His father, Michel Chicoyneau , was born in Blois in 1626 . He was the son of Michel Chicoyneau, elected in the election of Blois, and Marie Richier de Belleval, of Picardy origin. The couple were married in Blois in 1624. The Chicoyneaus are bourgeois from Blois who, from the condition of draper merchants, rose to the offices of notary and tax collector.

In 1652, Michel Chicoyneau joined his cousin Martin Richer de Belleval, who practiced medicine, in Montpellier . He succeeded him, in 1664, as intendant of the Royal Garden .In 1678, he became a counsellor in the court of accounts, aid and finance of Montpellier, a charge which conferred on him nobility.

His mother, Catherine de Pichot, was the daughter of Balthasar Pichot, king's adviser in the court of accounts, aid and finance of Montpellier, and of Catherine de Pourtalès.

Siblings 
Michel Chicoyneau and Catherine de Pichot have as children:

 Michel Aimé (1670 6 - 1691 7 );
 Gaspard (1673 8 - 1693 9 ), accidentally drowned in the Lez while botanizing;

References 

1672 births
1752 deaths
French physicians
17th-century French physicians
Court physicians